Aettupanku Mohammedkhan Babu (born 26 October 1957) was a judge of Kerala High Court.The  High Court of Kerala  is the highest court in the Indian state of Kerala and in the Union Territory of Lakshadweep. The High Court of Kerala is headquartered at Ernakulam, Kochi

Early life and education
Babu was born at Kanjirappally, Kottayam, Kerala in 1957. Completed his schooling from St.Thomas High School, Keezhillam. Graduated from St. Berchmans College, Changanassery and obtained a law degree from Udupi Law College, Udupi.

Career
Babu enrolled as an Advocate in 1981. He joined Kerala Judicial Service as Munsiff in 1989, promoted as Sub-Judge in 1992 and as District Judge in 2002. Babu appointed as served as Additional Director, Kerala Judicial Academy, Kochi in 2010 and as Director on 12.04.2012. On 5 October 2016 he was appointed as additional judge of Kerala High Court, became permanent from 16 March 2018 and demitted his office upon attaining age of superannuation on 26 October 2019.

References

External links
 High Court of Kerala

Living people
Judges of the Kerala High Court
21st-century Indian judges
1957 births
People from Kottayam